The Kristal is an action game/adventure game first released in 1989 for the Amiga computer.  It was later released for the Atari ST and MS-DOS.  It was developed by the UK-based company Fissionchip Software, and published in Europe by Addictive Games and in the US by Cinemaware.  Unusually for a video game, the game is based on a play, The Kristal of Konos, written in 1976; the authors of the play worked together with the game developers and the play was never shown in theatres or on film before the game's release. A dialog introducing the setting recorded by Patrick Moore, who introduced both the game and play.

The player takes the role of a pirate named Dancis Frake, on a mission to recover the "Kristal" on behalf of the Kring of Meltoca.

The game features a number of different classic game genres merged: fighting, space flight/combat, and (to a limited extent) LucasArts-style point-and-click adventuring.

Reception
The game was reviewed in 1989 in Dragon #152 by Hartley, Patricia, and Kirk Lesser in "The Role of Computers" column. The reviewers gave the game 4 out of 5 stars. Computer Gaming World gave the game a very negative review, citing the poor controls for the action sequences and the repetitive interrogation of other characters. The review summed up the game saying, "The Kristal is virtually unplayable except to the master arcade gamers that might have the time and patience for the "challenge"."

Reviews
Info (Nov, 1989)
The Games Machine (Jun, 1989)
Atari ST User (Jun, 1990)
The Games Machine (Apr, 1990)
The One (Apr, 1989)
Commodore User (Mar, 1989)
The Games Machine (Jul, 1990)
Computer and Video Games (Jun, 1989)
ASM (Aktueller Software Markt) (Feb, 1989)
ACE (Advanced Computer Entertainment) (Jul, 1989)
Power Play (Apr, 1989)

References

External links

The Kristal at the Hall of Light

1989 video games
Addictive Games games
Amiga games
Atari ST games
Cinemaware games
DOS games
Science fantasy video games
Single-player video games
Video games about pirates
Video games developed in the United Kingdom